Black surgeonfish is a common name for several fishes and may refer to:

Acanthurus gahhm
Ctenochaetus hawaiiensis